Tiangong-3 was a proposed Chinese space station, part of the Tiangong program. The China National Space Agency (CNSA) was originally expected to launch Tiangong-3 around 2015, following the launch of the Tiangong-2 test laboratory, originally planned for 2013. The goals for the Tiangong-2 and Tiangong-3 laboratories were eventually merged, and the latter was therefore not ordered.

Development 
In 2008, the China Manned Space Engineering Office (CMSEO) published a brief description of Tiangong-2 and Tiangong-3, indicating that several crewed spaceships would be launched in the late 2010s to dock with Tiangong-3. The first Tiangong module, Tiangong-1, was launched in September 2011 and docked with the uncrewed Shenzhou 8 spacecraft in November 2011, marking China's first orbital docking.

Specifications 
Tiangong-3 was expected to provide:
 Unaided 40-day habitability for three astronauts.
 Testing for regenerative life-support technology, and verification of methods of orbital replenishment of propellant and air.
 A multi-docking berthing mechanism, allowing up to two spacecraft to dock with it simultaneously.

See also 

 Chinese Lunar Exploration Program
 Chinese space program
 International Space Station

References 

Chinese space stations
Tiangong program
2015 in spaceflight
2015 in China
Cancelled space stations